"Joy" is a 1992 song recorded by French singer-songwriter François Feldman. It was the third single from his third album Magic Boul'vard, and was released in the first days of February 1992. The song, the singer's 12th single overall, achieved great success in France, becoming the best-selling single of the year.

Composition
Unlike his previous singles, "Joy" was fully created by Feldman: he wrote the lyrics, composed and music and produced the song. The singer's friends Carole Fredericks, Joniece Jamison who recorded with him the hit singles "Joue pas" in 1989 and "J'ai peur" in 1991, as well as the Chorus of the Little Children of Asnières performed the background vocals. The song is a tribute to the singer's daughter, named Joy, who was born a few time earlier. This pop song has dance sonorities and joyful percussion. The song was also recorded in Spanish-language on the album Magic Boul'vard, was also included on Feldman's three best of compilations Two Feldman (1996), Best Feldman (1998) and Gold (2008), and was performed during Feldman's 1991 tour and thus included on the live album Feldman à Bercy (1992).

Chart performance
In France, "Joy" entered the chart at number 15 on the chart edition of 8 February 1992, then entered the top ten, becoming Feldman's eighth top ten hit in France. Then it climbed and topped the chart from its 12th week of presence, dislodging Ten Sharp's hit "You" which was the former number one single. There it stayed for eight weeks, then dropped to number two after Nirvana's "Smells Like Teen Spirit" went atop and remained at this position for four weeks, then dropped rather quickly, totalling 23 weeks in the top ten and 28 weeks on the top 50. "Joy" is Feldman's most successful singles in terms of chart positions and allowed him to establish what was at the time a record on the French Single chart: to obtain a third number one hit, after "Les Valses de Vienne" and "Petit Frank". On the European Hot 100, "Joy" entered at number 73 on 22 February 1991, peaked at number 12 in its 12th and 13 weeks, and totalled 15 weeks in the top twenty and 26 weeks on the chart.

Track listings
 7" single, CD single, cassette
 "Joy" – 3:57
 "Belle Indienne" – 4:29

 12" maxi
 "Joy" (maxi version) – 6:42
 "Joy" (instrumental) – 3:57

 CD maxi
 "Joy" – 3:57
 "Belle Indienne" – 4:29
 "Joy" (maxi version) – 6:42

Charts

Weekly charts

Year-end charts

Release history

See also
 List of number-one singles of 1992 (France)

References

1991 songs
1992 singles
François Feldman songs
SNEP Top Singles number-one singles
Phonogram Records singles